Dodrill may refer to:

Dodrill, West Virginia
Dale Dodrill (1926–2019), American footballer
Forest Dewey Dodrill (1902–1997), doctor and mechanical heart co-developer
Dodrill–GMR, the first operational mechanical heart for open heart surgery
 Dean Dodrill, video game designer